Teng Chia-chi (born 24 May 1956) is a Taiwanese politician.

Teng obtained his bachelor's and master's degree in civil engineering from National Cheng Kung University and doctoral degree in environmental engineering from the University of California, Los Angeles in the United States.

Teng is currently the Deputy Mayor of Taipei since 25 December 2014.

References

1956 births
Living people
Deputy mayors of Taipei
National Cheng Kung University alumni
University of California, Los Angeles alumni
21st-century Taiwanese politicians
20th-century Taiwanese politicians
Taipei City Councilors